Mauza Kalri is a village in  Mianwali District, Punjab, Pakistan. 
Mauza Kalri is 35 miles away from the city of Mianwali, on the Talagang–Rawalpindi road. It is also close to Namal Lake and Namal College.

This village is part of Awankari region and population mostly belongs to the Sighaal clan of Awan.

See also 
 Kalri (Mianwali District)
 Ahmed Gul Khel
 Namal Valley

Populated places in Mianwali District